Sergio Álvarez Moya (born 7 January 1985) is a Spanish equestrian who competes in the sport of show jumping.

Career
On 22 July 2001, Álvarez Moya won the Junior European Show Jumping Championships held at Las Mestas Sports Complex in Gijón, Spain, over Felix Hassmann and Michael Kearins.

On 18 July 2010, he achieved the third position at the 2010 Großer Preis von Aachen, the mayor competition of the 2010 CHIO Aachen.

On 9 June 2011, Álvarez Moya finished as runner-up in the 2011 Global Champions Tour of Cannes.

On 28 April 2013, he finished in the fourth position of the Show Jumping World Cup held at Göteborg.

On 21 August 2015, he qualified with the Spanish team for the Equestrian at the 2016 Summer Olympics. In the individual competition, he qualified for the Final, but failed in the attempt to get a medal, finishing in the 20th position.

References

External links
Sergio Álvarez Moya at FEI

1985 births
Living people
Spanish show jumping riders
Sportspeople from Asturias
People from Avilés
Equestrians at the 2016 Summer Olympics
Olympic equestrians of Spain
Spanish male equestrians
Competitors at the 2009 Mediterranean Games
Mediterranean Games competitors for Spain
Mediterranean Games silver medalists for Spain
Mediterranean Games medalists in equestrian